Indicum is an album by Swedish pianist Bobo Stenson recorded in 2011 and released on the ECM label.

Reception
The Allmusic review by Thom Jurek awarded the album 4 stars stating "The Stenson Trio is the rarest of bands, one that approaches its material as a series of queries to be summarily explored, rather than statements to be made. As such, Indicum succeeds in spades".

Track listing
All compositions by Jon Fält, Anders Jormin and Bobo Stenson except as indicated 
 "Your Story" (Bill Evans) - 2:52   
 "Indikon" - 6:03   
 "Indicum" - 3:10   
 "Ermutigung" (Wolf Biermann) - 5:09   
 "Indigo" - 4:20   
 "December" (Jormin) - 4:55   
 "La Peregrinacion" (Ariel Ramírez) - 8:26   
 "Event VI" (George Russell) - 3:11   
 "Ave Maria" (Traditional) - 7:48   
 "Tit Er Jeg Glad" (Carl Nielsen) - 6:42   
 "Sol" (Jormin) - 9:11   
 "Ubi Caritas" (Ola Gjeilo) - 6:41

Personnel
Bobo Stenson — piano
Anders Jormin — bass
Jon Fält — drums

References

ECM Records albums
Bobo Stenson albums
2012 albums
Albums produced by Manfred Eicher